Nirbhay Singh may refer to:

Nirbhay Singh (soldier) (1958–1984), Indian soldier
Nirbhay Singh (trade unionist), Fiji-Indian trade unionist
Nirbhay N. Singh, psychologist
Nirbhay Singh Gujjar, Indian dacoit
Nirbhay Singh Patel, Indian politician